Beixinqiao Subdistrict is a subdistrict in the northern part of Dongcheng District, Beijing, China. The Yonghe Temple is located here. The subdistrict consists of 10 communities. By 2020 it has a total population of 55,449. Beijing Subway Line 5 runs through the subdistrict.

This area of land was called "Xingqiao" During the Yuan dynasty, and was changed to "Beixinqiao" in the Qing dynasty. There was a legend about Chinese monk Yao Guangxiao having locked up a Dragon King inside a well.

History

Administrative Division 
As of 2021, there are a total of 10 communities in the subdistrict:

Famous Sites 

 Yonghe Temple
 Bailin Temple
 Tongjiao Temple

External Link 
Official website (Archived)

References 
Dongcheng District, Beijing
Subdistricts of Beijing
Neighbourhoods of Beijing